Fathering: A Journal of Theory, Research, and Practice about Men as Fathers, is a peer-reviewed academic journal established in 2003 as the third of five published by Men's Studies Press and the first worldwide to focus specifically on fatherhood. Editor-in-Chief is Jaipaul Roopnarine.

See also 
 Men's studies
 Gender studies

References

External links 
Journal content link

Sociology journals
Publications established in 2003
English-language journals
Triannual journals
Men's studies journals
2003 establishments in the United States
Fatherhood
Works about parenting